Big Eyes ( – after 1542) was a Wichita woman who acted as a guide for Francisco Vázquez de Coronado's expedition exploring what is now the southwestern United States.

Sometimes described simply as the tattooed woman, Big Eyes had two lines tattooed under her eyes accentuating her cheekbones, as was customary among Wichita women. Big Eyes was captured by Tejas people in 1535, who traded her to Tiwa Puebloans in what is now Arizona. In 1540 Coronado's expedition defeated the Tiwa in the Tiguex War near the Red River; Big Eyes was captured and taken as a slave by one of Coronado's officers, Juan de Zaldívar. Being familiar with the area, Big Eyes acted as a guide for the expedition along with a man known as El Turco, who claimed to know the location of the mythical Seven Cities of Gold. By the time Coronado reached Quivira in the spring of 1541 it was clear that the cities would not be found; Coronado executed El Turco and Big Eyes slipped away from the Spaniards, returning to her people.

In 1542, another Spanish explorer, Hernando de Soto, reached the Mississippi Valley, having traveled from Florida on the Atlantic coast. Hearing stories of a woman who had traveled with Coronado, de Soto's companion Luis de Moscoso Alvarado sought out Big Eyes to learn news of the expedition from the Pacific coast. She gave a chronology of the expedition and sketched a crude map in the dust, which Moscoso's soldiers copied onto parchment and which would eventually reach Europe.

Little is known of Big Eyes after her 1542 encounter with de Soto's expedition.

References

1520 births
Year of death unknown
16th-century Native Americans
16th-century Native American women
16th-century slaves
Wichita people
Captives of Native Americans
Explorers of the colonial Southwest of the present United States